Cryptoplax iredalei, the Iredale's fleshy-chiton, is a species of chiton in the genus Cryptoplax.

Description
Body is narrow and flattened, oval shaped, with 8 shell sections or valves. The basic color is brown to red-brown, sometimes with light and dark bands.

Distribution and habitat
This species is endemic to southeastern and southwestern Australia. These chitons can be found subtidally under rocks and stones.

Etymology
The name honours Tom Iredale.

References

Chitons
Molluscs described in 1923